Tiny Teddy is a brand of sweet biscuits manufactured by Arnott's in Australia, since 1991.

Scott Dewar, son of biscuit designer Robert Dewar is credited with the concept of shrinking the normal "Teddy Bear Biscuit" to a bite sized and cute "Tiny Teddy". 

Each biscuit is small and teddy bear-shaped, and variations in facial expression have been given the names Happy, Sleepy, Grumpy, Cheeky, Silly and Hungry. They are similar in appearance to the North American Teddy Grahams.

Tiny Teddy biscuits are available in seven flavours:
Chocolate chip
Chocolate
Honey
Chocolate half coat
Caramel
Cookies and cream
100s and 1000s (released 2010)

Also available are three "Tiny Teddy Creams" varieties, two larger tiny teddies joined with a cream filling, in double chocolate, vanilla and strawberry flavours; and "Tiny Teddy Dippers", a lunchbox portion of a handful of tiny teddies and a dipping sauce of white chocolate, strawberry or chocolate-hazelnut.
In 2004 Arnott's released a range of savoury Tiny Teddy biscuits, but these weren't successful and were shortly discontinued.

In 2006 Arnott's authorised the release of four story books, aimed at pre-school aged children, published as the 'Arnott's Tiny Teddy Adventure Stories'.

In Indonesia, Tiny Teddy are sold as Nyam-Nyam Teddy or Good Time Teddy.

See also
 Hello Panda
 Koala's March
 Teddy Grahams

References

External links
 

Australian snack foods
Biscuit brands
Australian brands